Jay Fulton (born 4 April 1994) is a Scottish professional footballer who plays as a midfielder for Swansea City. He previously played for Falkirk, and spent time with Oldham Athletic and Wigan Athletic on loan from Swansea. He represented Scotland at international youth levels up to under-21s.

Club career

Falkirk
Fulton spent time with the youth systems of Celtic and Heart of Midlothian before finishing his development at Falkirk. He made his first team debut aged 17 on 12 April 2011 as a substitute in Falkirk's 2–1 away win over Partick Thistle in the Scottish First Division. He made one further appearance that season (a 2–0 home win over the same opponents).

Swansea
Fulton signed for Welsh side Swansea City on 'transfer deadline day' of the 2014 January transfer window for an undisclosed fee, on a two-and-a-half-year deal. On 26 April 2014, he made his Premier League debut as an 83rd-minute substitute in Swansea's 4–1 win over Aston Villa. After an impressive end to the season Fulton was rewarded with a new four-year contract at Swansea, keeping him at the club until June 2018. On 18 September 2015, he joined League One side Oldham Athletic on a three-month emergency loan deal. He scored his first goal for Swansea in a 3–1 EFL Cup win against Peterborough United on 23 August 2016. On 25 January 2018, Fulton joined Wigan Athletic on loan for the remainder of the 2017–18 season. On 18 January 2021, he signed a new deal with Swansea, keeping him at the club until June 2024.

On the 29 May 2021, Fulton was sent off in the 65th minute at Wembley during Swansea's eventual loss to Brentford in the 2020–21 EFL Championship play-off final.

Personal life
Fulton is a third-generation footballer in his family. His grandfather Norrie Fulton played for Pollok and scored the winning goal in the 1981 Scottish Junior Cup Final. His father is former Falkirk, Celtic and Heart of Midlothian player Steve Fulton; he was born during his father's short spell in England with Bolton Wanderers. His brothers Dale and Tyler Fulton both played for Falkirk.

Career statistics

Honours
Falkirk
Scottish Challenge Cup: 2011–12

References

External links

Scotland stats at Scottish FA

Living people
1994 births
Footballers from Bolton
People from Cumbernauld
Footballers from North Lanarkshire
Scottish footballers
Scotland youth international footballers
Scotland under-21 international footballers
English footballers
Anglo-Scots
Association football midfielders
Celtic F.C. players
Heart of Midlothian F.C. players
Falkirk F.C. players
Swansea City A.F.C. players
Wigan Athletic F.C. players
Scottish Football League players
Scottish Professional Football League players
Premier League players
English Football League players